The Catskill Fly Fishing Center and Museum is a nonprofit, educational organization dedicated to: preserving America's fly fishing heritage; teaching its future generations of fly fishers; and protecting its fly fishing environment.  The museum is located along Willowemoc Creek in the heart of the Catskills at 1031 Old Route 17 in Livingston Manor, New York.

The center operates a museum, an education center, as well as an environmental research center.  They collect, care for, interpret, and display angling equipment, art, and artifacts in a way that explains the traditions and techniques of the fly fishing sport.  The center conducts educational programs in river ecology, angling history, stream craft, including fishing etiquette, fly tying, fly casting, aquatic entomology, and stream improvement to increase public awareness of the values of fly fishing, prime among which is respect for the natural environment and the habitats of fly-responsive fishes.

The museum opened in 1983 as a store front museum in Roscoe, New York.  By 1986 and thereafter, the museum enhanced the resources and facilities enabling them to consolidate activities, establish environmental camps for children, and plan for the future.

On May 28, 1995, it opened at its current location on a  parcel in Livingston Manor on the banks of Willowemoc Creek.  The same year it received title to Junction Pool which is the headwaters of the main stream of Beaver Kill.

The Museum and Center is a nonprofit educational organization dedicated to preserving America's fly fishing heritage, teaching its younger generations of fly fishers and promoting the future of fly fishing. The Museum and Center operates a historical and contemporary museum and an education center..

The Catskill Fly Fishing Center and Museum is the home of The Fly Fishing Hall of Fame, The Demarest Rodmakers Gallery, The Poul Jorgensen Golden Hook Award, The Catskill Rodmakers Gathering, and The Hardy Cup. Projects currently underway include the Wulff Gallery and The Catskill Rodmakers Workshop and Arts of the Angler Craft Center. It is a sister museum to Italy's International Museum of Fly Fishing, Stanislao Kuckiewicz in Castel di Sangro.

Notes

External links
Catskill Fly Fishing Center and Museum

Fly fishing
Museums in Sullivan County, New York
Sports museums in New York (state)
Catskills
Recreational fishing in the United States
1983 establishments in New York (state)
Museums established in 1983
Fishing museums
Environmental organizations based in New York (state)
Nature centers in New York (state)